Teariki William Heather (born 30 July 1959) is a Cook Islands politician and former Cabinet minister who served as Deputy Prime Minister of the Cook Islands from 2013 to 2018. Previously a member of the Cook Islands Party, he is now the leader of the Cook Islands United Party.

Early life
Heather was born on Rarotonga and educated at Arorangi Primary school and Tereora College.  He is the younger brother of Democratic Party MP William (Smiley) Heather. He was a businessman before entering politics.

Political career
In March 2003 Heather founded the Cook Islands National Party with the aim of securing political reform, including a shorter Parliamentary term.  The party launched a high-profile court case against MPs Norman George and Paora Teiti in an effort to have them unseated for performing consultancy work for the government, which was seen as making them public servants and thus ineligible to hold office, but the case was unsuccessful.  Heather contested the 2003 Rua'au by-election as a National Party candidate, but was unsuccessful.  He subsequently disbanded the party and joined the Cook Islands Party.

In the 2004 elections Heather entered Parliament after winning the seat of Akaoa. The 2006 election produced a tie in the seat, forcing a by-election which Heather won.

Cabinet
At the 2010 election Heather was re-elected and was one of four candidates for the post of Deputy Prime Minister. He did not gain that position, but was appointed to Cabinet as Minister of Infrastructure & Planning. Shortly after his appointment he was warned by the Public Service Commissioner about attempting to privately employ a new Head of Ministry in violation of the Public Service Act. In April 2012 he was appointed Minister of Police. Shortly afterwards he was accused of corruption over the allocation of government contracts to his family business. Later that year he suggested amending the law to allow parents to smack their children. A Cabinet reshuffle in November 2013 saw him pick up the Justice portfolio. In December 2013 he was appointed Deputy Prime Minister, filling the vacancy created by the resignation of Tom Marsters.

Heather was re-elected at the 2014 election. A further Cabinet reshuffle in March 2015 saw him yield the Justice portfolio to Nandi Glassie.

In February 2016 news emerged that Heather was being investigated for corruption by the Financial Intelligence Unit. Prime Minister Henry Puna refused to suspend him.

Heather was not re-elected at the 2018 election, losing to Nooroa o Teariki Baker.

United party
Following his election loss Heather founded the Cook Islands United Party with former MP Nandi Glassie. He subsequently contested the 2019 Ivirua by-election but was unsuccessful. In the 2022 election he contested the seat of Murienua, promising that it would be his last term in parliament if elected. He was elected along with two other United party MP's.

References

Living people
1959 births
Members of the Parliament of the Cook Islands
Deputy Prime Ministers of the Cook Islands
Infrastructure ministers of the Cook Islands
Interior ministers of the Cook Islands
Planning ministers of the Cook Islands
Cook Islands National Party politicians
Cook Islands Party politicians
Cook Islands United Party politicians
People from Rarotonga